Corallorhiza wisteriana, the spring coralroot, arousing coralroot or Wister's coralroot, is a species of coralroot orchid. It is widespread through much of Mexico as well as parts of the United States (Rocky Mountains, Appalachians, the Southeast, and the Mississippi and Ohio Valleys).

Spring coralroot blooms as early as December in Florida through early spring in other parts of the country. The flowers generally only last a few hours.

This plant prefers leaf litter in woodland areas and is saprophytic.

References

External links 

wisteriana
Orchids of the United States
Orchids of Mexico
Plants described in 1829